The Technological Institute of Ciudad Juárez (In Spanish: Instituto Tecnológico de Ciudad Juárez), popularly known as ITCJ, is a public, coeducational university located in the city of Ciudad Juárez, Chihuahua, Mexico.

History
It was founded on October 3, 1964, substituting the Regional Technological Institute (ITR), No. 11, that also substituted the Industrial and Commercial Technical School No. 21.

Academics
ITCJ has 13 bachelor's degrees programs, three graduate programs, and one doctorate.

Bachelor's degree programs 

 Business Administration
 Accounting
 Electronic Engineering
 Mechanical Engineering
 Computer Engineering
 Electro-Mechanical Engineering
 Electrical Engineering
 Mechatronics Engineering
 Industrial Engineering
 Information Technologies and Communication Engineering
 Business Management Engineering
 Logistics Engineering

Master programs 

 Industrial Engineering
 Administration Engineering
 International Business Administration
 Doctor Program
 Industrial Engineering

Athletics

 Running
 Baseball
 Basketball
 Football
 Judo
 Soccer
 Swimming
 Volleyball

External links
 Official website

Universities and colleges in Chihuahua
Ciudad Juárez
Educational institutions established in 1964
1964 establishments in Mexico